Blue Streak is the name of three supervillains appearing in American comic books published by Marvel Comics.

Publication history
Blue Streak first appeared in Captain America #217-218 (Jan.–Feb. 1978), created by Roy Thomas, Don Glut, and John Buscema. He was killed by the Scourge of the Underworld in Captain America #318 (June 1986).

Fictional character biography

Don Thomas

In Captain America #217 S.H.I.E.L.D. decides to put together a group of Super-Agents, of which Blue Streak becomes a member. Later in Captain America #218 Captain America outed Blue Streak as a spy for the Corporation.

After the events of issues #217-218, Justin Hammer re-designed Blue Streak's equipment and funded his operations. After leaving prison, the Blue Streak led a successful career as a professional criminal in the American Midwest. Blue Streak was contacted by Gary Gilbert about the serial killings of super-villains. Blue Streak was invited to join an underground network to locate and eliminate the killer, but he refused. Shortly afterwards, Blue Streak had a run-in with Captain America, and while making his escape, was subsequently murdered by the Scourge of the Underworld.

In Captain America #427 the shape-shifter Dead Ringer obtained samples of dead tissue from Blue Streak's body so he could impersonate him.

In Punisher vol.7 #5 Blue Streak appeared as one of the eighteen criminals, all murdered by the Scourge, to be resurrected by Hood using the power of Dormammu as part of a squad assembled to eliminate the Punisher. Blue Streak wound up fighting the Punisher's partner Henry instead, who broke Blue Streak's neck and apparently killed him.

Jonathan Swift

Blue Streak (Jonathan Swift) first appeared during the height of the "Civil War" storyline. He is the successor of the original Blue Streak.

Using money from one of his heists, Blue Streak forms a team of similarly garbed thieves called Fast Five, consisting of Gold Rush, Silver Ghost, Green Light and Redline.

During the "Avengers: Standoff!" storyline, Blue Streak and the rest of the Fast Five appear as inmates at Pleasant Hill which secretly serves as a S.H.I.E.L.D. Prison

During the "Opening Salvo" part of the "Secret Empire" storyline, Blue Streak appears as a member of the Army of Evil.

Powers and abilities
The original Blue Streak's equipment included rocket-powered roller skates which allowed forward and backward movement and leaping, lasers mounted on the arms of his suit, and caltrops that he used to puncture the tires of pursuing cars.

The Jonathan Swift version of the Fast Five wears an armored suit with the same type of roller skates.

Other versions

MC2 Bluestreak

Bluestreak (Blue Kelso) is a fictional character who appeared in the Marvel Comics series A-Next. The character appears as a mutant capable of running at superhuman speeds. Her top velocity is unknown, but she is shown to be able to exceed the speed of sound. She is also shown to possess incredible stamina. She is a mutant gifted with incredible speed, who left the newest incarnation of the X-Men (the X-People) because they were not "flashy" enough for her. Bluestreak's real name is later revealed as Blue Kelso.

Bluestreak appears as a member of the Dream Team, who soon become part of the new Avengers team. She quickly develops a crush on teammate J2 (a fact to which he is completely oblivious). Bluestreak is characterized as cocky and impulsive, with a cheerful attitude, and is shown having problems following the orders of Mainframe. When Mainframe's inert body needs to be taken across the city in less than a minute, she places him on a gurney and covers the needed distance in virtually no time at all, even remarking afterwards that she could have stopped for a sandwich, but did not want to show off.

References

External links
 
 Blue Streak (Don Thomas) at Marvel Database wiki

 
 Blue Streak (Jonathan Swift) at Marvel Database wiki

Bluestreak (psychic) at Marvel Database wiki

Characters created by John Buscema
Characters created by Mike Deodato
Characters created by Roy Thomas
Characters created by Tom DeFalco
Characters created by Warren Ellis
Comics characters introduced in 1978
Comics characters introduced in 1999
Comics characters introduced in 2007
Marvel Comics 2
Marvel Comics characters who can move at superhuman speeds
Marvel Comics mutants
Marvel Comics superheroes
Marvel Comics supervillains
S.H.I.E.L.D. agents